Horsepen Creek may refer to:
Horsepen Creek (Little Nottoway River tributary), in Nottoway County, Virginia
Horsepen Creek (Potomac River tributary), in Fairfax County, Virginia
Horsepen Creek (Reedy Fork tributary), in Guilford County, North Carolina
Horsepen Creek (Uwharrie River tributary), in Montgomery County, North Carolina